A number of candidates affiliated with John Turmel's Abolitionist Party of Canada contested the 1995 Ontario provincial election.  The party was not registered at the provincial level, and the candidates appeared on the ballot as independents.  Information about them may be found here.

Steven Edward White (Ottawa East)

White listed himself as a croupier in the 1993 federal election.  He campaigned on a Turmel-led slate for the National Capital Freenet System Board of Directors in 1997, and described himself as owning a property care business in 1997.  He has sought elected office at both the provincial and federal levels.

Candidates in Ontario provincial elections
Abolitionist Party of Canada politicians